"Second Hand Heart" is a song recorded by American singer Danny Gokey. It was released July 4, 2011 through RCA Records Nashville as the intended lead single for his second studio album; however, he parted ways with the label in November 2011 and that album never materialized. The song was later included on Gokey's self-released 2012 extended play, Love Again. "Second Hand Heart" was written by Cary Barlowe, Josh Kear, and Shane Stevens and was produced by Mark Bright.

Content
"Second Hand Heart" is a country song that incorporates a soulful, raspy vocal and "pop-leaning" production. Lyrically, the song speaks to the emotional baggage people carry and sends the message that a "second hand heart" is still capable of great love.

Critical reception
Matt Bjorke of Roughstock was complimentary of the song, writing that "Second Hand Heart" has "the sound of a song that can and should help re-establish Danny Gokey as a viable country radio star." Billy Dukes of Taste of Country gave the song a more mixed, two-and-a-half star review and described it as "very vanilla." "On paper, it's a touching tale," he writes, "Sonically, Gokey's voice isn't strong enough to soar through the long stretched out syllables."

Chart positions
"Second Hand Heart" debuted and peaked at number 48 on the Billboard Hot Country Songs chart dated August 27, 2011.

Release history

References

2011 songs
2011 singles
Danny Gokey songs
RCA Records Nashville singles
Songs written by Cary Barlowe
Songs written by Josh Kear
Songs written by Shane Stevens (songwriter)